Wire Daisies were an English band from Cornwall, who were signed to EMI 'Angel' offshoot. The idea for the band was mooted in 1999 by three members of the group who had met at a party to mark the solar eclipse, however it was not until 2002 that the band finally took shape.

After recording a batch of material in a farmhouse in Cornwall, the band signed to digital record label Transistor Project, which was co-founded by Blur drummer Dave Rowntree. The band's female lead vocalist, Treana Morris, was 'discovered' by Roger Taylor of the rock band Queen, and their bassist Ol Beach is the son of Queen's manager Jim Beach. In 2006, the band joined Robbie Williams's tour to South Africa and performed alongside Robbie Williams and Freshlyground in Johannesburg, Durban and Cape Town.

After becoming a popular downloaded act, the band signed to EMI and re-issued their debut album, Just Another Day. In 2007, their second album, Wiredaisies, was released on the same label.

The band was featured in Three Men in More Than One Boat in which Cornwall native Rory McGrath and fellow comedians Griff Rhys Jones and Dara Ó Briain visited them while they were recording at the Sawmills Studio.

Band members
 Treana Morris (lead vocals)
 Ol Beach (keyboards)
 Steve Jackson (drums)
 Alden Evans (lead guitar)

Discography

References

External links
 Wire Daisies streaming music at Myspace Music
 BBC - Cornwall - Music Story
 Fan review of 'Just Another Day'

English rock music groups